Earl Cavis Kerkam (1891– 1965) was an American painter. According to Willem de Kooning, Philip Guston, Mark Rothko, George Spaventa and Esteban Vicente, he “was one of the finest painters to come out of America.” Gerald Norland wrote at the Earl Kerkam Memorial Exhibition in 1966:
”A painter of enormous poetic awareness, self-directed, almost totally without direct influence, he stands as an original American artist in the best sense.”

Earl Kerkam painted and lived in Paris, France in the early 1950s. There, Kerkam developed a mentor and collegial relationship with the artist Norman Carton which extended through their returns to New York City, the 1955 Whitney Annual, and their solo exhibits at World House in the 1960s. 

Earl Kerkam died on January 12, 1965, in New York City.

Selected solo exhibitions

1933 (first) and the 1930s: Contemporary Arts Gallery, New York City; Babcock Gallery, New York City; J.B. Newmann Gallery, NY;
1940, 1942, 1943, 1944: Bonestell Gallery, NY;
1946, 1948, 1952, 1953, 1955: Charles Egan Gallery, New York City
1947-1949: Harold Wacker’s Chinese Gallery;
1955, 1956: Poindexter Gallery, New York City;
1960, 1961, 1963: World House Gallery, New York City;
1964: B.C. Holland Gallery, Chicago, Illinois;

Selected group exhibitions
1951, 1953-1957: Ninth Street Show, and Stable Gallery Annuals, New York City;
1949, 1955: The Whitney Museum of American Art, Annuals and Biennials, New York City.

Public collections

Metropolitan Museum of Art, New York City, New York
Brooklyn Museum, Brooklyn, New York
Kresge Art Museum at Michigan State University, East Lansing, Michigan
San Francisco Museum of Modern Art (SFMOMA), San Francisco, California
Smithsonian American Art Museum (SAAM), Washington, D.C.
Weatherspoon Art Museum, University of North Carolina, Greensboro, North Carolina
Museum of Art and Archaeology at University of Missouri, Missouri, Missouri

See also
 Art movement
Abstract expressionism
Action painting
New York School
Expressionism
Ninth Street Show

References

 Smithsonian Institution Research Information System; Archival, Manuscript and Photographic Collections, Earl Kerkam
 Marika Herskovic, American Abstract and Figurative Expressionism: Style Is Timely Art Is Timeless (New York School Press, 2009.) . p.  136-139  p. 140-143
 Marika Herskovic, New York School Abstract Expressionists Artists Choice by Artists, (New York School Press, 2000.) . p. 16; p. 37; p. 198-201

External links

 Earl Kerkam paintings from the collection of the Smithsonian American Art Museum

1891 births
1965 deaths
Abstract expressionist artists
20th-century American painters
American male painters
Modern painters
Art Students League of New York alumni
20th-century American male artists
Painters from New York City
Painters from Washington, D.C.
Federal Art Project artists